Waldemar Blatskauskas, also known simply as Waldemar (17 March 1938 – 6 March 1964) was a Brazilian professional basketball player.

Club career
During his pro career, Blatskauskas played with the Brazilian clubs Regatas Campinas, Tietê, São Carlos Clube, and XV de Novembro de Piracicaba.

National team career
Blatskauskas was a member of the senior Brazilian national basketball team that won gold medals at the 1959 FIBA World Championship, and the 1963 FIBA World Championship. With Brazil, he also won a bronze medal at the 1960 Summer Olympic Games. He also won the following medals: a bronze medal at the 1959 Pan American Games, a silver medal at the 1963 Pan American Games, gold medals at the 1958 FIBA South American Championship and the 1961 FIBA South American Championship, and a gold medal at the 1963 Summer Universiade.

Personal
Blatskauskas died in Brazil, in a traffic accident, on 6 March 1964.

External links
 Waldemar Blatskauskas FIBA Profile 1
 Waldemar Blatskauskas FIBA Profile 2
 Waldemar Blatskauskas FIBA Profile 3
 
 
 Waldemar Blatskauskas CBB Profile 

1938 births
1964 deaths
Basketball players at the 1960 Summer Olympics
Brazilian men's basketball players
1959 FIBA World Championship players
1963 FIBA World Championship players
Brazilian people of Lithuanian descent
FIBA World Championship-winning players
Medalists at the 1960 Summer Olympics
Olympic basketball players of Brazil
Olympic bronze medalists for Brazil
Olympic medalists in basketball
Basketball players at the 1959 Pan American Games
Basketball players at the 1963 Pan American Games
Pan American Games silver medalists for Brazil
Pan American Games bronze medalists for Brazil
Pan American Games medalists in basketball
Power forwards (basketball)
Road incident deaths in Brazil
Small forwards
Basketball players from São Paulo
Universiade medalists in basketball
Universiade gold medalists for Brazil
Medalists at the 1963 Summer Universiade
Medalists at the 1959 Pan American Games
Medalists at the 1963 Pan American Games